William Biddle may refer to:
 William P. Biddle (1853–1923), 11th Commandant of the United States Marine Corps
 William W. Biddle (1900–1973), American psychologist, major contributor to the study of propaganda
 William Biddle Shepard (1799–1852), congressional representative from North Carolina
 USS William P. Biddle (APA-8), a Heywood-class attack transport

Biddle, William